Miriam Hopkins (born 28 October 1960) is an Irish former swimmer. She competed in the women's 200 metre butterfly at the 1976 Summer Olympics.

References

External links
 

1960 births
Living people
Irish female swimmers
Olympic swimmers of Ireland
Swimmers at the 1976 Summer Olympics
Place of birth missing (living people)